Karusellen, originally Lördagskväll, was a Sveriges Radio entertainment programme originally airing on 27 January 1951, and led by Lennart Hyland

One of the most famous events in the history of the programme was when Swedish bandy player Gösta Nordgren appeared on 26 January 1952. performing the song "Flottarkärlek" live.

References

1951 establishments in Sweden
Swedish radio programs
1951 radio programme debuts
Sveriges Radio programmes
Variety radio series